Chitra Te Shera is a 1976 Pakistani Punjabi language historical fiction film, directed by Iqbal Kashmiri and produced by Babar Iqbal. The film stars actress Shahnaz in the lead role, with Yousuf Khan, Aasia, Sultan Rahi, and Ilyas Kashmiri as the villain.

Cast
 Shahnaz – Reshma
 Yousuf Khan – Shera
 Asiya – Amina
 Sultan Rahi – Chitra Daku
 Munawar Zarif – Boota Singh
 Nayyar Sultana – Malika Jazbbat
 Adeeb – Farangi
 Afzaal Ahmad – Farangi
 Ilyas Kashmiri – Farangi
 Waheeda Khan 
 Kamal Irani
 Sheikh Iqbal – Lala Tarmdas
 Naeem Hashmi 
 Atia Sharf
 Sultan Iqbal
 Rehana Babari
 Hamid Hussan
 Ali Ejaz (Guest)
 Najma (Guest appearance)
 Jaggi
 Shah Nawaz
 Najma Mehboob

Track list

References

External links
 

History of Pakistan on film
Films set in the partition of India
Films set in the British Raj
Punjabi-language Pakistani films
1976 films
1970s buddy films
1970s Punjabi-language films
Pakistani historical action films